The ancient Egyptian hieroglyph of a Spine issuing fluid is Gardiner sign listed no. F40 for the animal spine, fluid falling from each end. Another hieroglyph, Gardiner F39 shows only half of the spine, F39-(referring to 'dignity', or 'to be revered').

The Spine with fluid hieroglyph is used in Egyptian hieroglyphs as a biliteral with the language value of Aw-(Au) and consists of the Egyptian vowel uniliterals of a, the vulture, Gardiner G1-(birds), G1 and w, the quail chick, Gardiner G43, G43

The use of the Spine with fluid hieroglyph is for words showing "length", as opposed to 'breadth', (Egyptian usekh-(breadth, width)-for example, the Usekh collar). Some example words for 'length' are: to be long, length, to extend, extended; and for to expand, to dilate, words like: joy, gladness, pleasure, delight.

See also

Gardiner's Sign List#F. Parts of Mammals
List of Egyptian hieroglyphs

References

Betrò, 1995. Hieroglyphics: The Writings of Ancient Egypt, Betrò, Maria Carmela, c. 1995, 1996-(English), Abbeville Press Publishers, New York, London, Paris (hardcover)
Budge. An Egyptian Hieroglyphic Dictionary, E.A.Wallace Budge, (Dover Publications), c 1978, (c 1920), Dover edition, 1978. (In two volumes) (softcover)

Egyptian hieroglyphs: parts of mammals